K. S. R. Krishna Raju (11 March 1948 – 22 July 2002) was an Indian ornithologist who worked extensively in the Eastern Ghats of Vishakapatnam. He conducted multiple avifaunal surveys, ringed birds and collaborated with other ornithologists including Dillon Ripley and Salim Ali. His studies provided weight to the Satpura hypothesis proposed by Sunder Lal Hora that the Eastern Ghats was part of a former continuum of habitats between the northeast of India and the Western Ghats with affinities to those in Southeast Asia. A subspecies of Abbott's babbler, Malacocincla abbotti krishnarajui, discovered around Visakhapatnam Ghats of Andhra Pradesh, was named in his honour, "for his efforts to promote the survey and conservation of the natural resources of the Eastern Ghats."

Biography
Krishna Raju was born on 11 March 1948 to K.V.V. Gopala Raju and Sita Devi. He was a brother of the journalist K. N. Y. Patanjali. 
 
Raju joined the Bombay Natural History Society (BNHS) as a field biologist at Point Calimere and worked with S. A. Hussain and was a pioneering Indian bird ringer. In 1971, he set up a bird banding camp at Lambasingi village in the Eastern ghats of Andhra Pradesh where, he along with Selvin Justus discovered the presence of the little spiderhunter a species then known to be isolated in the Western Ghats and found again only in northeastern India and Southeast Asia.

In 1975, Raju joined a team of BNHS members on a study expedition in the Eastern ghats of Vishakapatnam. In 1981 and again in 1983, Raju accompanied Dillon Ripley and Salim Ali for short collection trips. During these trips, they mist-netted an Abbott's babbler, a species the known only from north-east in India and Southeast Asia. This relict population was found to be distinctive and was  described as a subspecies that named was after Krishna Raju by Bruce Beehler and Dillon Ripley as Malacocincla abbotti krishnarajui. This was yet another species that gave weight to the Satpura hypothesis suggested by the Indian zoologist Sunder Lal Hora to explain the faunal similarities of Peninsular India and that of Southeast Asia.

Raju continued his efforts in conservation of the Eastern ghats through his publishing efforts until his death.

Publications 

Krishna Raju's publications include:

References 

Indian ornithologists
1948 births
2002 deaths
Scientists from Visakhapatnam
20th-century Indian zoologists
Members of the Bombay Natural History Society